Palaiochori (old form Palaiochorion, Παλαιοχώριον) is a village on the island of Lesbos, North Aegean, Greece. It is situated on a mountainside 12 km NW from the town of Plomari. The church of the village was built in 1864 and is dedicated to the Annunciation of the Virgin Mary. The beach of Melinda is located 3 km south of the village.

References

Populated places in Lesbos